Günter Morge (13 August 1925 in Leipzig – 21 January 1984) was a German entomologist who specialised in Diptera.

For most of his career Morge worked at the Institut fur Pflanzenschutzforschung in Berlin mostly on Acalyptrate Diptera. He was also curator of the large Diptera collections at Admont Abbey.

Works

1967 Die Lonchaeidae und Pallopteridae Österreichs und der angrenzenden Gebiete. 2. Teil. Die Pallopteridae. Naturkundliches Jahrbuch der Stadt Linz 13: 141-212.
1982 Beiträge zur Kenntnis von Typen-Exemplaren und wenig bekannten Dipteren-Arten. IV. Beiträge zur Entomologie 32: 3–38.
1984 Diptera collectionis P. Gabriel Strobl – 13. (Typen-Designierung der Exemplare der sogenannten 'Typensammlung'). Beiträge zur Entomomologie 34: 319–335.

References
 Müller, H. J. & Ebert, W. 1984: [Morge, G.] Beitr. Ent. 34(2) 295-296, Portrait.
 Rohlfien, K. 1994: [Morge, G.] Studia dipterologica 1(1) 12-13

External links
DEI Zalf Portrait

German entomologists
Dipterists
1925 births
1984 deaths
20th-century German zoologists